The Latin Monetary Union (LMU) was a 19th-century system that unified several European currencies into a single currency that could be used in all member states when most national currencies were still made out of gold and silver. It was established in 1865 and disbanded in 1927. Many countries minted coins according to the LMU standard even though they did not formally accede to the LMU treaty.

History

Preliminary context
The LMU adopted the specifications of the French gold franc, which had been introduced by Napoleon I in 1803 and was struck in denominations of 5, 10, 20, 40, 50 and 100 francs, with the 20 franc coin ( of .900 fine gold struck on a  planchet) being the most common. In the French system the gold franc was interchangeable with the silver franc based on an exchange ratio of 1:15.5, which was the approximate relative value of the two metals at the time of the law of 1803.

Initial treaty

By treaty dated 23 December 1865, France, Belgium, Italy, and Switzerland formed the Latin Monetary Union. They agreed to a combined gold and silver standard (bimetalism) with a gold-to-silver ratio of 15.5 to 1 as established in the French Franc.

The treaty required that all four contracting states strike freely exchangeable gold coins and silver coins according to common specifications. Before the treaty, for example, the fineness of the silver coins in the four states varied from 0.800 to 0.900.  The treaty required that the largest silver coin of 5 francs be struck 0.900 fine and the fractional silver of 2 francs, 1 franc, 50 centimes and 20 centimes all be struck at 0.835 fine. The agreement came into force on 1 August 1866.

The LMU served the function of facilitating trade between different countries by setting the standards by which gold and silver currency could be minted and exchanged. In this manner a French trader could accept Italian lire for his goods with confidence that it could be converted back to a comparable amount of francs.

Further joining members
Following the International Monetary Conference of 1867, the original four nations were joined by Greece on April 10, 1867. Greece took advantage of a clause in the treaty that guaranteed admission of foreign states that agreed to abide by the treaty. Spain and Romania also considered joining. The discussions broke off unsuccessfully, but both countries nevertheless made an attempt to conform their currencies to the LMU standard. Austria-Hungary refused to join the LMU because it rejected bimetallism, but signed a separate monetary treaty with France on December 24, 1867 whereby both states agreed to receive into their treasuries one another's gold coins at specified rates. Austria-Hungary thereafter minted some but not all of its gold coins on the LMU standard, including the 4 and 8 florin, which matched the specifications of the French 10 and 20 francs.

Other states later adopted the system without formally joining the treaty: The colonies of France (including Algeria) came under the scope of the treaty in 1865; Peru adopted the franc system by law on July 31, 1863; Colombia and Venezuela followed in 1871; the Grand Duchy of Finland adopted the system on August 9, 1877; Serbia on November 11, 1878; and Bulgaria on May 17, 1880. Coins struck for the Spanish territory of Puerto Rico in 1895 adhered to the standard, with one peso to five Spanish pesetas. In 1904, the Danish West Indies were also placed on this standard but did not join the Union itself. When Albania emerged from the Ottoman Empire as an independent nation in 1912, coins of the Latin Monetary Union from France, Italy, Greece, and Austria-Hungary began to circulate in place of the Ottoman Lira. Albania did not however mint its own coins, or issue its own paper money until it adopted an independent monetary system in 1925.

With the tacit agreement of Napoleon III of France, Giacomo Antonelli, the administrator of the Papal Treasury, embarked from 1866 on an ambitious increase in silver coinage without the prescribed amount of precious metal, equivalent to Belgium's total. The papal coins quickly became debased and excessively circulated in other union states, to the profit of the Holy See, but Swiss and French banks rejected papal coins and the Papal States were ejected from the Union in 1870, owing 20 million lire.

Issues

Bimetalism failure
From the beginning, fluctuations in the relative value of gold and silver on the world market stressed the currency union. This is today recognized as an inevitable effect of a currency based on bimetalism when precious metal prices fluctuate. When the LMU was formed in 1865, silver was nearing the end of a period of high valuation compared to gold. In 1873 the value of silver dropped significantly, followed by a sharp increase in silver imports in the LMU countries, particularly in France and Belgium. Indeed, in all of 1871 and 1872 the French mint had received just 5,000,000 francs of silver for conversion to coin, but in 1873 alone received 154,000,000 francs. Fearing an influx of silver coinage, the member nations of the Union agreed in Paris on January 30, 1874, to limit the free conversion of silver temporarily. By 1878, with no recovery in the silver price in sight, minting of silver coinage was suspended absolutely. From 1873 onwards, the Union was on a de facto gold standard. The law still permitted payment in silver, but custom demanded and enforced payment in gold. The 5 franc silver pieces were "essentially upon the same footing as bank notes".

More importantly, because new discoveries and better refining techniques increased the supply of silver, the fixed LMU exchange rate eventually overvalued silver relative to gold. German traders, in particular, were known to bring silver to LMU countries, have it minted into coinage then exchanged those for gold coins at the discounted exchange rate. These destabilizing tactics eventually forced the LMU to convert to a pure gold standard for its currency in 1878.

Debasement of the coinage 
Some members, notably the Papal State, began to debase their currency. The Vatican minted Papal lira coins with an inadequate amount of silver (0.835 fine) and then exchanged them for coins from other countries that had been minted correctly, thus in effect forcing other members of the Union to do the same. According to the BBC, Greece with its "chronically weak economy meant successive Greek governments responded by decreasing the amount of gold in their coins, thereby debasing their currency in relation to those of other nations in the union and in violation of the original agreement". Greece was formally expelled from the Latin Monetary Union in 1908. It was readmitted in 1910, however.

Paper money issues
According to the Financial Times, another major problem of the LMU was that it failed to outlaw the printing of paper money based on the bimetallic currency. France and Italy exploited this weakness by printing banknotes to fund their own endeavours, effectively "forcing other members of the union to bear some of the cost of its fiscal extravagance by issuing notes backed by their currency".

Effect of the Great War 
The political turbulence of the early twentieth century which culminated in the First World War brought the Latin Monetary Union to its final end in practice, even though it continued de jure until 1927, when it came to a formal end.

The last coins made according to the standards (i.e., diameter, weight and silver fineness) of the Union were the Swiss half, one-franc, and two-franc pieces of 1967. However, Austria still mints gold 4 and 8 florin gold coins to the LMU specifications for collectors and investors, and modern gold rounds to LMU standards are also commercially minted.

Impact
A 2018 study in the European Review of Economic History found that the LMU had no significant effects on trade, except during the period 1865–1874.

The Latin Monetary Union inspired the Scandinavian Monetary Union, established in 1873.

Coins
Below are examples of coins of 5 units silver coins:

See also
 Bimetallism
 Economic and Monetary Union of the European Union
 Euro
 Latin Union
 Spanish peseta
 Stella (United States coin)

Notes

References

Further reading

External links

 Grand-dad of today's Euro: The Latin Monetary Union (1865-1927)
 Coins of the Latin Monetary Union: 1865 - 1926

Economic history of France
Economic history of Greece
Economic history of the Holy See
Economic history of Italy
Economic history of Romania
Economic history of Serbia
Economic history of Spain
Economic history of Switzerland
19th-century economic history
Metallism
Currency unions
Numismatics
Economic history of Belgium